The Pierce County Herald may refer to either of two newspapers:

 The Puyallup Herald, a newspaper in Pierce County, Washington that formerly had this title
a newspaper in Pierce County, Wisconsin, merged with the Red Wing Republican Eagle in 2019